Joshua-Douglas James Naylor (born June 22, 1997) is a Canadian professional baseball first baseman and outfielder for the Cleveland Guardians of Major League Baseball (MLB). He previously played for the San Diego Padres. Naylor was the 12th overall selection in the 2015 MLB draft, and he made his MLB debut for the Padres in 2019. He was traded to Cleveland during the 2020 season.

Amateur career
Throughout his amateur career, he played for the Ontario Blue Jays of the Premier Baseball League of Ontario (PBLO). This elite travel baseball team regularly competed in tournaments across North America, and was composed of the top young players in all of Ontario.

Naylor attended St. Joan of Arc Catholic Secondary School in Mississauga, Ontario. He made the Canadian junior national baseball team at the age of 15, winning the silver medal at the Under-18 Baseball World Cup held in South Korea in 2012. He won the bronze medal at the 2014 Under-18 Baseball World Cup, and competed in the 2015 Under-18 Baseball World Cup.

In 2014, Naylor was chosen as one of the ten high school invitees to the MLB Junior Select Home Run Derby during the MLB All-Star Week at Target Field, becoming the first Canadian to participate in the event. He finished in second place. Later in 2014, he appeared in the Perfect Game All-American Classic at Petco Park and the Under Armour All-America Baseball Game at Wrigley Field.

Naylor was committed to enroll at Texas Tech University to play college baseball for the Texas Tech Red Raiders baseball team. In 2015, Perfect Game ranked Naylor among the top 50 available prospects available in the 2015 Major League Baseball Draft, and he made Baseball Americas High School All-American first team.

Professional career

Miami Marlins
The Miami Marlins selected Naylor in the first round, with the 12th overall selection, of the 2015 MLB draft. He signed with the Marlins after his June 25 graduation from St. Joan of Arc for a reported signing bonus of $2.25 million, and was assigned to the Gulf Coast Marlins of the Rookie-level Gulf Coast League for his professional debut. Naylor played in 25 total games for the Marlins posting a .327 batting average with one home run and 16 RBIs.

Naylor began the 2016 season with the Greensboro Grasshoppers of the Class A South Atlantic League. In June he was suspended without pay after injuring teammate Stone Garrett with a knife as part of a prank. He was selected to appear in the 2016 All-Star Futures Game.

San Diego Padres
On July 29, 2016, the Marlins traded Naylor, Carter Capps, Jarred Cosart, and Luis Castillo to the San Diego Padres for Andrew Cashner, Colin Rea, Tayron Guerrero, and cash considerations. Naylor was assigned to the Lake Elsinore Storm of the Class A-Advanced California League. In 122 games between the Grasshoppers and the Storm, Naylor batted .264 with 12 home runs and 75 runs batted in.

Naylor played for Team Canada in the 2017 World Baseball Classic. He began the 2017 season with Lake Elsinore. The Padres promoted him to the San Antonio Missions of the Class AA Texas League in July. Naylor finished 2017 with a combined .280 average with ten home runs and 64 RBIs between both clubs. He returned to San Antonio in 2018, and began playing as an outfielder.

Naylor opened the 2019 season with the El Paso Chihuahuas of the Triple-A Pacific Coast League.

On May 24, 2019, Naylor was called up to the San Diego Padres. He made his MLB debut that night versus the Toronto Blue Jays.

Cleveland Indians / Guardians
On August 31, 2020, the Padres traded Naylor, along with Austin Hedges, Cal Quantrill, and minor league players Gabriel Arias, Owen Miller, and Joey Cantillo, to the Cleveland Indians in exchange for Mike Clevinger, Greg Allen, and Matt Waldron. In the 2020 American League Wild Card Series, Naylor recorded five hits in his first five career postseason plate appearances, the first player in MLB history to do so.

During a game against the Minnesota Twins on June 27, 2021, Naylor collided with second baseman Ernie Clement while trying to catch a pop up in shallow right field. He broke and dislocated his ankle, which required season ending surgery.

On May 9, 2022, in a game against the Chicago White Sox, Naylor became the first player in Major League history to hit two three-run home runs or grand slams in the ninth inning or later of the same game. He also became the first player to have at least eight RBI in the eighth inning or later since RBI became an official statistic in 1920. His first one was a game-tying grand slam in the top of the 9th off of Liam Hendriks to tie the game at eight runs apiece then his second was a go-ahead three-run home run in the top of the 11th off of Ryan Burr which would win the game 12–9.

On January 13, 2023, Naylor agreed to a one-year, $3.35 million contract with the Guardians, avoiding salary arbitration.

Player profile
He profiles as a power hitter, and Greg Hamilton, the coach of the Canadian national junior team, described Naylor's hitting approach as "advanced".

Personal life
Naylor is the eldest of three brothers, Noah and Myles, born to Chris and Jenice Naylor in Mississauga, Ontario, Canada. His brother Noah was drafted in the first round of the 2018 MLB draft by the Cleveland Indians.

References

External links

1997 births
Living people
Baseball people from Ontario
Black Canadian baseball players
Canadian expatriate baseball players in the United States
Cleveland Guardians players
Cleveland Indians players
El Paso Chihuahuas players
Gulf Coast Marlins players
Greensboro Grasshoppers players
Lake Elsinore Storm players
Leones del Escogido players
Canadian expatriate baseball players in the Dominican Republic
Major League Baseball first basemen
Major League Baseball left fielders
Major League Baseball players from Canada
Major League Baseball right fielders
San Antonio Missions players
San Diego Padres players
Sportspeople from Mississauga
World Baseball Classic players of Canada
2017 World Baseball Classic players